Mine Guri is an Albanian politician who served as deputy chair of the Presidium of the People's Assembly. She was a lathe worker before involving in politics. In 1961 she joined the ruling party of the Communist Albania, Albanian Workers' Party. She became its first secretary in Kuçovë and Berat and a member of People's Assembly in 1970 and served there until 1990. She was made a member of the central committee of the ruling party, Albanian Workers' Party, in November 1976. She was appointed deputy chair of the Presidium of the People's Assembly in November 1982 under the presidency of Ramiz Alia. She also held the post in the last communist government formed in September 1990. The other deputy chair in the same government was Xhafer Spahiu.

Guri married in October 1961 and has five children. As of 2011 Guri was living in Berat.

References

20th-century Albanian women politicians
Albanian communists
Labour Party of Albania politicians
Living people
Members of the Politburo of the Labour Party of Albania
Year of birth missing (living people)
People from Berat
Women members of the Parliament of Albania